Sympistis glennyi is a moth of the family Noctuidae first described by Augustus Radcliffe Grote in 1873. It is found in western North America from the mountains of southern Alberta west to British Columbia and south at least to Colorado and California.

The wingspan is about 35 mm.

References

G
Moths of North America
Fauna of California
Moths described in 1873